The Republic of New Afrika (RNA), founded in 1968 as the Republic of New Africa (RNA), is a black nationalist organization and black separatist movement in the United States popularized by black militant groups. The larger New Afrika movement in particular has three goals:

 Creation of an independent black-majority country situated in the Southeastern United States, in the heart of an area of black-majority population.
 Payment by the federal government of several billion dollars in reparations to African-American descendants of slaves for the damages inflicted on Africans and their descendants by chattel enslavement, Jim Crow laws, and modern-day forms of racism.
 A referendum of all African Americans to determine their desires for citizenship; movement leaders say their ancestors were not offered a choice in this matter after emancipation in 1865 following the American Civil War.

The vision for this country was first promulgated by the Malcolm X Society on March 31, 1968, at a Black Government Conference held in Detroit, Michigan. The conference participants drafted a constitution and declaration of independence, and they identified five Southern states Louisiana, Mississippi, Alabama, Georgia and South Carolina (with adjoining areas in East Texas and North Florida) as subjugated national territory.

History
The Black Government Conference was convened by the Malcolm X Society and the Group on Advanced Leadership (GOAL), two influential Detroit-based black organizations with broad followings. The attendees produced a Declaration of Independence (signed by 100 conferees out of approximately 500), a constitution, and the framework for a provisional government. Robert F. Williams, a human rights advocate then living in exile in China, was chosen as the first president of the provisional government; attorney Milton Henry (a student of Malcolm X's teachings) was named first vice president; and Betty Shabazz, widow of Malcolm X, served as second vice president.

The Provisional Government of the Republic of New Afrika (PG-RNA) advocated/advocates a form of cooperative economics through the building of New Communities—named after the Ujamaa concept promoted by Tanzanian President Julius Nyerere. It proposed militant self-defense through the building of local people's militias and a standing army to be called the Black Legion; and the building of racially based organizations to champion the right of self-determination for people of black African descent.

The organization was involved in numerous controversial issues. For example, it attempted to assist Oceanhill-Brownsville area in Brooklyn to secede from the United States during the 1968 conflict over control of public schools. Additionally, it was involved with shootouts at New Bethel Baptist Church in 1969 (during the one-year anniversary of the founding) and another in Jackson, Mississippi, in 1971. (It had announced that the capital of the Republic would be in Hinds County, Mississippi, located on a member's farm.) In the confrontations, law-enforcement officials were killed and injured. Organization members were persecuted for the crimes the members claimed was in self defense.

Notable members
Queen Mother Moore was a founding member. She helped found the group and helped out in the group as much as she could.
Robert F. Williams was a black nationalist elected as the first president of the Republic of New Afrika.
Betty Shabazz, widow of Malcolm X, was elected as second vice president of the first administration in 1968, working alongside Williams and Henry.
Chokwe Lumumba, formerly Edwin Finley Taliaferro of Detroit, was elected as second vice president in 1971. He later became an attorney, working in Michigan and Mississippi in public defense. After settling in Jackson, Mississippi, he was elected to the city council there. He was elected as mayor in 2013, dying in office in February 2014 of natural causes.
Sanyika Shakur, former leader of Eight Tray Gangster Crips and author (Monster: The Autobiography of an L.A. Gang Member)

Leaders
 Robert F. Williams, President in Exile (1968–1971)
 Imari Obadele, President (1971–1991)

Publications 

 The Article Three Brief. 1973. (New Afrikans fought U.S. Marshals in an effort to retain control of the independent New Afrikan communities shortly after the U.S. Civil War.)
 Obadele, Imari Abubakari.  Foundations of the Black Nation, Detroit: House of Songay, 1975.
 Brother Imari [Obadele, Imari]. War In America: The Malcolm X Doctrine, Chicago: Ujamaa Distributors, 1977.
 Kehinde, Muata. RNA President Imari Obadele is Free After Years of Illegal U.S. Imprisonment.  In Burning Spear Louisville: African Peoples Socialist Party, 1980. pp. 4–28
 Obadele, Imari Abubakari.  The Malcolm Generation & Other Stories, Philadelphia: House of Songhay, 1982.
 Taifa, Nkechi, and Lumumba, Chokwe. Reparations Yes! 3rd ed.  Baton Rouge: House of Songhay, 1983, 1987, 1993.
 Obadele, Imari Abubakari. Free The Land!: The True Story of the Trials of the RNA-11  Washington, D.C. House of Songhay, 1984.
 New Afrikan State-Building in North America. Ann Arbor. Univ. of Michigan Microfilm, 1985, pp. 345–357.
 "The First New Afrikan States".  In The Black Collegian, Jan./Feb. 1986.
 A Beginner's Outline of the History of Afrikan People, 1st ed. Washington, D.C. House of Songhay, Commission for Positive Education, 1987.
 America The Nation-State. Washington, D.C. and Baton Rouge. House of Songhay, Commission for Positive Education, 1989, 1988.
 Walker, Kwaku, and Walker, Abena. Black Genius. Baton Rouge. House of Songhay, Commission for Positive Education, 1991.
 Afoh, Kwame, Lumumba, Chokwe, and Obafemi, Ahmed. A Brief History of the Black Struggle in America, With Obadele's Macro-Level Theory of Human Organization. Baton Rouge. House of Songhay, Commission for Positive Education, 1991.
 RNA. A People's Struggle. RNA, Box 90604, Washington, D.C. 20090–0604.
 The Republic of New Africa New Afrikan Ujamaa: The Economics of the Republic of New Africa. 21p. San Francisco. 1970.
 Obadele, Imari Abubakari.  The Struggle for Independence and Reparations from the United States 142p. Baton Rouge. House of Songhay, 2004.
 Obadele, Imari A., editor  De-Colonization U.S.A.: The Independence Struggle of the Black Nation in the United States Centering on the 1996 United Nations Petition 228p. Baton Rouge. The Malcolm Generation, 1997.

 Taifa, Nkechi. 'Black Power, Black Lawyer: My Audacious Quest for Justice' 379p. Washington, DC, House of Songhay II, 2020.

See also
 Secession in the United States
 Back-to-Africa movement
 Bantustan
 Black Power
 Deep South
 Harry Haywood
 Malcolm X
 Northwest Territorial Imperative, a white nationalist idea involving the creation of a white-only state in the Pacific Northwest
 Mutulu Shakur
 Liberia and Sierra Leone, countries colonized to resettle freed slaves in Africa
 Aliyah, the immigration of Jewish emigrants to Palestine
 Republic of Texas, formed out of Mexican Texas by American pioneers

References

External links

RNA links
 Provisional Government – Republic of New Afrika (Official Web Site)
 The Republic of New Afrika
 New Afrika (Online Blog)

Archives
 RNA documents in the Freedom Now! archival project at Brown University – Tougaloo College archives.
 The Republic of New Africa vs. the United States, 1967–1974, documents on police surveillance and repression of the RNA as well as protest by the organization at the Radical Information Project.

Articles and reports
 [https://web.archive.org/web/20080120225302/http://hoohila.stanford.edu/firingline/programView.php?programID=146 Firing Line]: The Republic of New Africa] William F. Buckley interviews Milton Henry, President of the Republic of New Afrika. Program number 126. Taped on Nov 18, 1968 (New York City, NY). 50 minutes.  Available from the Hoover Institution.  The first 5 minutes are accessible in streaming RealAudio.
 Understanding Covert Repressive Action: The Case of the US Government Against the Republic of New Africa by Christian Davenport, Professor of Peace Studies and Political Science at the Kroc Institute, University of Notre Dame.
 The Real Republic of New Africa By Dennis Smith, News Director. February 3, 2005. Accessed April 1, 2005
Taifa, Nkechi (2015). "Republic of New Afrika". In Shujaa, Mwalimu J.; Shujaa, Kenya J. (eds.). The SAGE Encyclopedia of African Cultural Heritage in North America''. SAGE Publications, Inc. . .

Independence movements
African-American history by location
COINTELPRO targets
1968 establishments in Michigan
Separatism in the United States
Slavery in the United States
Reparations for slavery
Black separatism
Politics and race in the United States
Proposed countries
Black Power
African-American leftism
Organizations established in 1968
Politics of the Southern United States
History of the Southern United States
Southeastern United States
African and Black nationalism in the United States